Ang Li (李昂; Li Ang) (born 1985 in Beijing, China) is a classical pianist.

Early years
Ang Li began playing the piano by ear at age one. Ang Li made her first public appearance at Beijing Concert Hall at age six. At age thirteen, she made her orchestral debut with the Little Orchestra Society of New York at Avery Fisher Hall. In 2007, Ms. Li was invited by The China National Center for the Performing Arts to replace pianist Li Yundi in the performance of the Ravel Piano Concerto in G major with the China National Symphony Orchestra. She was re-engaged to perform at that venue with the Beijing Symphony Orchestra in 2008. She has also performed with the Montréal Symphony Orchestra, Fort Worth Symphony Orchestra, Staten Island Symphony, The Lanaudière Music Festival Orchestra, City Chamber Orchestra of Hong Kong, American Academy of Conducting Orchestra, and one month prior to performing at Avery Fisher Hall, Ms. Li made her orchestral debut with the Manhattan School of Music Repertory Orchestra.

Selected awards
Li is a citizen of Canada and the United States of America. She gained national renown after winning the OSM Standard Life Competition, in which she was awarded the First Prize in the B category, Best Interpretation of a Canadian Work Prize, Orchestre symphonique de Montréal Prize, Radio-Canada Prize, Galaxie Rising Stars Award, and the Jeunesses Musicales of Canada Award. Ang Li is a Steinway Artist.

Selected performances
Ang Li has performed on five continents: North and South America, Europe, Australia and Asia. She has appeared at Carnegie Hall, John F. Kennedy Center for the Performing Arts, Alice Tully Hall at Lincoln Center for the Performing Arts, National Arts Centre in Ottawa, Ruïnekerk of Bergen in the Netherlands, Hong Kong City Hall, Forbidden City Concert Hall in Beijing, among others.

Li commissioned and premiered the Canadian-American composer, Jared Miller's newest piano work, "Souvenirs d'Europe." Recently, the piece won the coveted ASCAP Morton Gould Young Composers Award. In this competition, Miller's score and Li's recording were selected out of nearly 700 submissions from across the United States. Ang Li also gave the US premiere of Jerome Blais' work: "Es ist genug!", as well as the India, Hong Kong, mainland China and Scotland premiere of Alexina Louie's Memories in an Ancient Garden.

Education
Li holds a bachelor's degree from The Curtis Institute of Music, a master's degree from The Juilliard School, and an Artist Diploma from Texas Christian University.

Broadcast recitals and recordings
Li's numerous live recital broadcasts by The Canadian Broadcasting Corporation since 2003 include the opening recital for the 2006 NAC/CBC Aber Diamond Debut Series in Ottawa. Li was also featured on WQXR-FM in a simulcast performance at the Instituto Cervantes New York hosted by David Dubal. Li's recital debut in China as part of the 2007 "Meet in Beijing Arts Festival" was televised nationally by China Central Television. Li has also been featured on WBJC, KBIA, American Public Media, CKWR-FM's Women in Music, and CFMZ-FM where she was voted one of the highlights from the best Classical 96.3 "Concert Lobby" performances of 2010. Recordings of her live competition performances at the Twelfth and Thirteenth Van Cliburn International Piano Competition feature works by Brahms, Bowen, Debussy, Granados, Haydn and Liszt. She has also recorded CDs for the China Record Corporation and Contemporary Record Society.

Publications
Li has been featured in publications such as the Piano Artistry, Fort Worth Weekly, Huffington Post, Sequenza21, The Montreal Gazette, Fort Worth Star-Telegram, The Juilliard Journal, The Staten Island Advance, The Saugeen Times, The Hindu, The Indian Express, InDaily Australia, Deccan Herald, La Presse, The New Indian Express, The Hamilton Spectator, among others.

References

1985 births
Living people
Women classical pianists
Canadian classical pianists
American classical pianists
Canadian women pianists
Chinese emigrants to Canada
Curtis Institute of Music alumni
21st-century classical pianists
21st-century women pianists